At its essence, intellectual property rights are described as “a legal framework for contractual agreements concerning technologies, which encourage the institution of ‘markets for technology’, making easier the international transfer of technology and its diffusion at the local level.” The discussion that has taken place, concerning intellectual property rights and the following agreements, centers around spreading global knowledge and technologies. Intellectual property has been largely discussed and gone through a series of changes. At the globalized level, a global network for ideas led institutions to put policies in place and key players to form opposing viewpoints. Beyond intellectual property, alternative sources for innovation include forming partnerships and moving business activities abroad.

History of Intellectual Property Rights 
Intellectual property rights went through a series of phases to reach the globalized stage that it remains in today.

National Level 
Prior to the 20th century, intellectual property rights, dealing mainly with copyrights and patents, were decided on a national-basis. Countries decided and implemented their own laws that only applied within the nation state.

International Level 
However, the growth of trade and cross-border business activities marked a transition to expanding intellectual property rights. European nations led the development with a series of bilateral agreements. Particularly, authors and publishers from Great Britain argued the necessity of protecting British literature from being printed and sold abroad. This argued piracy, though legal at the time, meant a loss in profits for British writers like Charles Dickens, whose stories became extremely popular in the United States. Similarly for patents, inventors did not want to participate in the innovation fairs held in Vienna in the 1870s, worried others might steal their inventions. As a result, the convention created a law that would span the length of the fair and provide patent protections for inventors and their ideas. This sparked growing conversations of creating internationally recognized protections. Further talks among European nations led to the creation of the 1883 Paris Convention for the Protection of Industrial Property and the 1886 Berne Convention, together protecting copyrights, trademarks, and patents.

Non-Discrimination, National Treatment, and the Right of Priority 
The agreements’ foundational areas included non-discrimination, national treatment, and the right of priority. The non-discrimination idea gives foreign inventors the right to enter the market of a country also under the agreement, and national treatment protects the fair and equal treatment of that inventor. Lastly, the right of priority ensures that there is no misuse of intellectual property.

The Agreement on Trade-Related Aspects of Intellectual Property 
Due to globalization there is increased interconnections among corporations and nation state governments, which led to the creation of internationally recognized standards and policies. The World Trade Organization's Trade-Related Aspects of Intellectual Property Agreement (TRIPS), established in 1994 during the Uruguay round of trade talks, spearheaded agreements on intellectual property rights on a global scale and added more specific rules to be followed. All members of the WTO are obligated to abide by TRIPS and under the circumstances that any member infringes on these rules, the WTO has the jurisdiction to impose sanctions. However, the agreement faces a set of criticisms, with a major one claiming that its policies favor Western agendas and hurt developing nations.

Criticisms from Developing Countries 
The TRIPS agreement faces criticism because it increases the value of intellectual property, granting more privileges to dominant industry leaders and hindering developing countries. Some of the major criticisms from developing countries include implementation challenges, geographical indications, protection of local knowledge, and technology accessibility. The first difficulty is that it remains difficult to implement TRIPS outlined structure and policies for developing countries that lack the resources and support to fully and effectively implement the agreement. Additionally, geographical indications, which are similar to trademarks but differ by including specific countries and boundaries, limit the scope of intellectual property protection to few, specific categories. This is viewed as an unfair advantage by developing countries, who have less protection of their local goods and industries. Similarly, these countries claim that TRIPS does not hold up policies under the Convention on Biological Diversity (CBD), offering little protection for cultural customs and information, for example, the patents for herbal medicine from India or the widespread selling of Basmati rice.

TRIPS Effects on HIV/AIDS in Africa 
According to the World Health Organization, 25.7 million people in Africa have HIV and in 2018 470,000 died from AIDs. Prior to 1997, the majority of medicine in South Africa was patented by the pharmaceutical companies that distributed them and was costly as a result, making it difficult for those in need of the drugs to access them. This led to the creation of the Medicines and Related Substances Control Amendment Act, which overturned the TRIPS agreement under these specific circumstances. The act mandated local South African pharmaceutical companies licensing to make generic, affordable versions of patent protected HIV/AIDs drugs. This was met with opposition from pharmaceutical companies and the U.S. government, which responded with trade restrictions on South Africa in 1998, on the basis of intellectual property infringement. Ultimately, the Bush Administration altered its position and instead showed its commitment to developing countries and related causes. Pharmaceutical companies strongly support and rely on Intellectual Property rights to maintain healthy competition and create profit. Since the cost to manufacture drugs has increased steadily since the 1960s and the majority of drugs cannot cover them.

Cultural Effects 
A major current issue is the use of local information, typically belonging to low-income nations, in ways that are not regulated or protected. It is found that local information is the basis of approximately 60% of remedies in Western countries. This presents cultural implications, such as appropriation and the exploitation of traditional knowledge. An example is the case of the Hoodia cactus, a plant used by the African aboriginal group the San for its ability to subdue a user's appetite. This property, called “P57,” was patented by the South African Council for Scientific and Industrial Research (CSIR) in 1995 and later licensed to a British firm. Additionally, P57 was bought and commercialized as a supplement for dieting by a U.S.-based pharmaceutical firm—Phytopharm. The product generated a market-value approximately between $1 billion and $8 billion. Subsequently, the San filed to sue the CSIR for violating the CBD, which protects biodiversity. Under the TRIPS agreement, local information like the use of the Hoodia cactus is considered public knowledge and to patent something depends on proof of innovation. The CBD, although not a framework for patents, can require that companies share the success to original holders of indigenous knowledge. In 2002, the CSIR agreed to share eight percent of the profits from Phytopharm and royalty payments with the San.

The Argument for the Globalization of Innovation and Knowledge 
Other opposition to the globalization of intellectual property rights are scholars who claim that unhindered knowledge transfer is necessary for innovation and achieving the spread of ideas that allows countries to develop. Countries benefit from adopting other countries’ technologies and inventions. A modern example is the utilization and sharing of information and technology amongst countries in the Organization for Economic Cooperation and Development (OECD), including India and China.

These scholars also claim that the implementation of the TRIPS agreement has little effect on countries and the protection of intellectual property. A report by the European Commission showed little to no change in exports for innovative technologies and products following the creation of TRIPS in the late 90s, with industry leaders continuously dominating growth. The globalization of knowledge and technology for spreading innovation can be done in numerous ways. Countries can do so by fostering R&D activities. Researchers from the Italian National Research Council and the University of London explained, “Creating such an environment requires a comprehensive effort ranging from public policies, education and human resources, a reliable legislative system and institutions, incentives and trade policies, sometimes referred to as developmental state. National R&D investment to absorb foreign technology has been a crucial enabling factor for US economic growth during the 1900–1946 period and for Japanese reconstruction during the postwar period.”

Alternative Avenues for Global Knowledge Transfer 
Modes that help spread knowledge globally, other than through licensing and patents of intellectual property rights, include multinational corporations setting up satellite offices and foreign direct investment, imports and exports, and joint ventures and strategic alliances. By operating an office in a foreign host country, the home country can better learn and incorporate the host nation's technologies. Further, imports and exports allow the exchange of “capital goods and equipment,” the foundation and processes behind innovation. Additionally, creating partnerships with firms in other countries allows firms to share their respective knowledge and skills with one another.

References

Intellectual property law